The 1968 All-Southwest Conference football team consists of American football players chosen by various organizations for All-Southwest Conference teams for the 1968 NCAA University Division football season.  The selectors for the 1968 season included the Associated Press (AP).

All Southwest selections

Offense

Quarterbacks
 Edd Hargett, Texas A&M (AP-1)

Halfbacks
 Chris Gilbert, Texas (AP-1) (CHFOF)
 Mike Richardson, SMU (AP-1)

Fullbacks
 Jackie Stewart, Texas Tech (AP-1)
 Steve Worster, Texas (AP-1)

Split ends
 Jerry LeVias, SMU (AP-1) (CFHOF)

Tight ends
 Deryl Comer, Texas (AP-1)

Tackles
 Richard "Truck" Stevens, Baylor (AP-1)
 Terry May, SMU (AP-1)

Guards
 Jim Barnes, Arkansas (AP-1)
 Don King, Texas Tech (AP-1)

Centers
 Rodney Brand, Arkansas (AP-1)
 Calvin Hunt, Baylor (AP-1)

Defense

Defensive ends
 Richard Campbell, Texas Tech (AP-1)
 Mike De Niro, Texas A&M (AP-1)

Defensive tackles
 Leo Brooks, Texas (AP-1)
 Loyd Wainscott, Texas (AP-1)

Defensive guards
 Larry Adams, TCU (AP-1)
 Rolf Krueger, Texas A&M (AP-1)

Linebackers
 Bill Hobbs, Texas A&M (AP-1)
 Cliff Powell, Arkansas (AP-1)

Defensive backs
 Gary Adams, Arkansas (AP-1)
 Larry Alford, Texas Tech (AP-1)
 Jim Livingston, SMU (AP-1)

Kicking specialists
 Ken Vinyard, Texas Tech (AP-1) (placekicker)
 Steve O'Neal, Texas A&M (AP-1) (punter)

Key
AP = Associated Press

CFHOF = Player inducted into the College Football Hall of Fame

See also
1968 College Football All-America Team

References

All-Southwest Conference
All-Southwest Conference football teams